El Atazar is a municipality of the autonomous community of Madrid in central Spain. It has a population of 102 inhabitants (INE, 2011).

Gallery

Public transport system 
El Atazar has only one bus line, and it doesn’t connect the village with Madrid. This line is: 

Line 913: Torrelaguna-El Atazar

References

Municipalities in the Community of Madrid